Idalus dares is a moth of the family Erebidae. It was described by Herbert Druce in 1894. It is found in Costa Rica and Colombia.

References

 

dares
Moths described in 1894